Zack Miller (born July 5, 1984) is an American professional golfer who has played on the PGA Tour. He graduated from Stanford University in 2007, where he was captain of the golf team. He turned professional that year, and spent two years playing on the Korean Tour and Gateway Tour, where he won twice. In 2010 he qualified for the Nationwide Tour, finishing 56th in the standings, and at the end of that year graduated to the main PGA Tour via the qualifying school.

Professional wins (2)
2009 Desert Summer #7, Desert Summer #9 (Gateway Tour)

See also
2010 PGA Tour Qualifying School graduates

References

External links
 

American male golfers
Stanford Cardinal men's golfers
PGA Tour golfers
Golfers from California
People from Greenbrae, California
Sportspeople from San Rafael, California
1984 births
Living people